Zerde is a traditional Persian, Iraqi, Turkish, dessert. The original rice pudding, infused with a generous amount of saffron giving it a vibrant yellow hue and a delicate floral flavour. This is a festive dish popular at weddings, births, and during holy festivities such as the first Sunday of the month of Sha'aban celebrating the birth of the prophet Zakariyya, and the first ten days of the sacred month of Muharram.

Zer, which means gold and or yellow,  comes from Persian zard (زرد) which means yellow. In some regions of Turkey, Zerdeçal Turmeric also added for a more intense colour. 
 
Zerde is very popular and has made its way to western Turkey with people immigrating to west at Eastern Thrace, which provides almost the half of country's rice production, zerde is a favored dessert. Flavoring ingredients of zerde vary slightly from region to region in Turkey depending on the local fruits.

Zerde differs from rice pudding insofar as it is prepared with water instead of milk.

One serving of zerde has approximately 215 calories.

See also
Zarda (food)
Sholezard

References

Rice pudding
Turkish puddings